Teresina is the capital and most populous municipality in the Brazilian state of Piauí. Being located in north-central Piauí 366 km from the coast, it is the only capital in the Brazilian Northeast that is not located on the shores of the Atlantic Ocean. With 871,126 inhabitants, Teresina is the 21st largest city in Brazil, and the 15th largest state capital in the country. Together with Timon in the nearby state of Maranhão, it forms a conurbation with a population of about 978,734 inhabitants; the entire metropolitan region of Teresina has over 1,226,509 inhabitants. The only natural barrier that separates Teresina from Timon is the Parnaíba river, one of the largest in the Northeast.

Teresina is the capital with the first best quality of life in the North-Northeast according to FIRJAN and the 4th in Brazil. It is among the 50 cities in the world with the highest murder rates, with 315 homicides in 2017.

Its motto is the Latin phrase Omnia in Charitatis, which means, in English, "All for charity". The city is the birthplace of, among others, Torquato Neto, who belonged to the Tropicalismo movement.

Its cathedral, Catedral Metropolitana Nossa Senhora das Dores, dedicated to Our Lady of Sorrows, is the archiepiscopal see of the Roman Catholic Archdiocese of Teresina.

History and names 

Teresina was founded on August 16, 1852, under the name of Vila Nova do Poty (because its origin is linked to the Poti river) as the capital of the state of Piauí. It was the first planned city in the Brazil and the only northeast capital located out of the coast. Until 1852, Oeiras was the capital of the Piauí Captaincy. However, due to difficulties in communication and trade, the capital was transferred to an area next to the Parnaíba River, to the other cities and to the sea coast. Colonization of the area where Teresina is now located dates back to the 18th century. The chosen place was a small community of fishermen, in 1760, nearby Poty and Panaíba rivers, which grew into a village called "Vila do Poty", but, due to the inundation of the Parnaíba River riverbanks, the city had to be built in a higher position.

In the 19th century, it was initially called Vila Nova do Poty, but later the city was renamed Teresina, in honor of Empress Teresa Cristina, the wife of Emperor Pedro II of Brazil.
 
Teresina is the hottest city in the country and the city with the third-highest incidence of lightning in the world. Nowadays, Teresina's economy is based on international manufacturing industries and trade.

Main sights 

Sights include:

Casa da Cultura de Teresina, exhibiting elements of the culture of the city, and home to cultural events
Centro Artesanal "Master Dezinho", home to handcrafts made of various materials, mainly clay, decorated with paintings;
Teatro 4 de Setembro, a theatre holding cultural shows, plays and others;
Mirante da Ponte Estaiada "João Isidoro França"
Encontro dos Rios, a natural place by the riverside Parnaíba and Poti.
Parque Zoobotânico, a zoo with typical animals of the Brazilian fauna and other countries. 
Igreja de São Benedito,  the main Catholic church of the city
Museu do Piaui, with numerous elements of the history of Teresina and of Piauí in general, including  antiques, furniture and  documents.

Geography 

Teresina is located on the east side of the Parnaíba river at the border with Maranhão state, at an altitude of about 72 meters. The city faces the city of Timon across the river and is situated between the Parnaíba river and its tributary the Poti River. The two rivers join at the city's northern end, where there is an environmental park with gazebos. Teresina is the largest capital in the northeastern territorial extension, at 1,756 km2.

Located in a transition zone between the northeast and the Amazon (Mid-North), Teresina is surrounded by mata dos cocais, savannas and cerradões where many carnaúba, babaçu, buriti palms, jatobás, ipês, and many other medium-sized trees can  be seen. In the region there are also remnants of Teresina Atlantic Forest, which makes the landscape shrub coverage very rich and dense.

Climate 
Teresina has a tropical wet and dry climate (Köppen climate classification: Aw) with semi-humid characteristics and two seasons: the rainy season (which occurs in summer and autumn) and the dry season (which occurs in winter and spring).

From January to May, due to the rains, the weather is hot and wet (likely to occur when there is fog in the morning), while from June to August the climate gets dry with relatively milder nights; in September to December the weather becomes hotter and humid, with the gradual return of rainy conditions from October. A peculiar feature of the rains in the city are their speed and intensity, with strong winds, large force of water and very common lightning.

These fluctuations are mitigated by the contribution of the winds. Air quality is considered good in Teresina, except in the driest period, when the relative humidity drops, and there are occurrences of fires.

Demographics

Religion

In 2010, 78.94% of the municipality's population was Roman Catholic, 13.34% were evangelicals, 4.49% had no religion, 0.89% Jehovah's Witnesses, 0.85% were spiritists, 0.74% others Christian religiosities (which include the Brazilian Catholic Apostolic Church, the Eastern Orthodox Church, Mormons and others) and 0.75% of other religions.

Among the Protestant denominations in Teresina, the majority is Pentecostal, about 7.79%. Baptists constitute 2.62% of the population of the municipality, 0.86% Adventists, 0.12% are Presbyterians, 0.08% the other Protestant groups (Lutherans, Congregationals and Methodists) and 1.84% have no denomination. The Assemblies of God is the largest Pentecostal group, with 4.16% of the population, followed by the Universal Church of the Kingdom of God with 1.31% and the Christian Congregation in Brazil with 0.41%.

Health
In Teresina there are 634  health institutions, eight hospitals, 181 clinics and 170 clinics, employing some 15,000 people.

Education 
English and Spanish are part of the official high school curriculum, in addition to the official national language, Portuguese.

Universities in Teresina 
 Universidade Federal do Piauí (UFPI);
 Universidade Estadual do Piauí (Uespi);
 Instituto Federal de Educação, Ciência e Tecnologia do Piauí (IFPI).
 Faculdade de Saúde, Ciências Humanas e Tecnológicas do Piauí (Faculdade Novafapi)
 Faculdade Integral Diferencial (Facid)
 Instituto Camilo Filho (ICF)
 Centro de Ensino Unificado de Teresina (CEUT)
 Faculdade das Atividades Empresariais de Teresina (FAETE)

Schools
School Sacred Heart of Jesus (1906)

Economy 
The Gross Domestic Product of Teresina represents about 40% of GDP in the state of Piaui. In industry, there is the textile and garment industry, which exports to other regions and generates about ten thousand jobs. There are also manufacturers bicycles, drink industries, pharmaceuticals, chemicals, furniture and ceramics, among others. The building deserves to be a fast-growing sector due to the verticality of the city over the past 15 years.

Transportation 
Teresina has a  subway service comprising  nine different stations.  There is also bus service through the city.  Teresina/Senador Petrônio Portella Airport, opened in 1967, lies north of the capital, between the rivers Parnaíba and Poty.

Sports 

The Albertão Stadium  holds 60,000 spectators, houses soccer, athletics and other games. A smaller stadium (6,000 places) is the  Lindolfo Monteiro Stadium, opened in 1944. It was restored in 2008.

Football teams Teresina include Flamengo-PI, River-PI, Tiradentes and Piauí-PI. Teresina has one rugby union club that is in Brazil's women's rugby top flight, Delta Rugby Clube.

References

External links 

   
 Teresina Info—Bilingual tourist information 
 Panoramic Teresina—Tourist information 
 Visit Piauí—Tourist information